The Neopup PAW-20 (Personal Assault Weapon, 20 mm) is a 20×42mm semi-automatic grenade launcher designed by Tony Neophytou and as of 2015, is produced and marketed by Denel.

Overview
The PAW-20 is a hand-held, semi-automatic direct fire grenade launcher that fires a 20 mm point detonating round. It holds six rounds in a detachable rotary magazine, with an effective range of 300–400 meters. It was designed mainly as an anti-personnel grenade launcher for use against opposition closely grouped together or behind light cover. However, it is also compatible with less-than-lethal ammunition. The PAW-20 is in direct competition with the more complicated and expensive joint German-U.S. XM25 CDTE and Korean S&T Daewoo K11.

The PAW-20 has attracted some criticism due to the location of the ejection port. On slow motion footage it can be seen that ejection happens after the hydraulic buffer is fully contracted, which brings the ejection port right to shooters face. Due to the unique location of the pistol grip on the side of the weapon, it can be fired from the left shoulder for a right-handed operator by simply placing the butt on the left shoulder, with no hand swapping necessary.

This allows the user the advantage of being able to fire from around or under cover, with little time required to change the grip on the weapon. The right-handed location of the pistol grip also allows the weapon to recoil unimpeded into the shoulder of the operator, allowing for a much more manageable recoil than most weapons of this class. Moreover, the weapon uses the recoil to operate, instead of more traditional gas operated systems and is an interesting example of an inertial operated weapon.

20x42 mm cartridge
The 20x42 mm cartridge was specifically developed for the PAW-20 by Denel PMP, decreasing the overall weight and size of the weapon, and enabling it to hold more rounds in the magazine, compared to weapons of similar purpose and design, such as the XM25 CDTE, which typically fire 25mm or larger grenades. It has a muzzle velocity of 310 m/s (1,000 ft/s), and a much flatter trajectory than the more common 40mm grenade launcher round. A number of less-than-lethal rounds are also available for the PAW-20.

Users

 – Peshmerga

See also

 RGSh-30
 Norinco LG5 / QLU-11
 OICW
 Milkor MGL
 Barrett XM109
 XM25 CDTE

References

Further reading
 The Neopup Is Back, And In Production (The Firearm Blog)

External links

 Modern Firearms
 Forgotten Weapons - Video about this Grenade Launcher
 Forgotten Weapons - Interview with the Designer
1999 introductions
Grenade launchers
Anti-materiel rifles
Grenade launchers of South Africa
Military equipment introduced in the 2010s